Nicolas Ivanoff (born 4 July 1967 in Ajaccio, Corsica) is a French pilot and flying instructor, who currently races in the Red Bull Air Race World Series under the number 7. Ivanoff is nicknamed "The Quick Corsican".
His highlight of 2010 so far is the attendance of the Headstart Aerospace Course at the University of Liverpool (UK) to play guest pilot of eight modified Grob G115E "Tutors." He makes numerous donations to charities and aeronautical organisations.

At the Red Bull Air Race World Series, he has been sponsored by the Hamilton Watch Company.

Racing record

Red Bull Air Race World Championship

2004-2010

2014-

Legend:
 CAN: Cancelled
 DNP: Did not participate
 DNS: Did not show
 DQ: Disqualified
 NC: Not classified

Gyarary

See also
 Competition aerobatics

References

Red Bull Air Race World Series official website

External links 

 nicolasivanoff.com

1967 births
Living people
Sportspeople from Ajaccio
French aviators
French air racers
Red Bull Air Race World Championship pilots